Live in Brazil is jazz vocalist Gary Williams's seventh album, recorded live onboard Royal Caribbean's ship Splendour of the Seas in 2013. It includes big band covers of songs by Gipsy Kings, Antônio Carlos and Tom Jobim, Frank Sinatra, Lady Gaga and Kylie Minogue. One song is recorded in English, German and Japanese. The live show was seen by over 20,000 Brazilians in 8 months.

Critical reception 

The album was received well by critics and reviewers.

Clive Fuller of Encore said: "It is always difficult to transfer a "live" performance to an album as the contact between performer and audience is so much a part of the success of the show. This album brings with it all the atmosphere of a modern cabaret/stage show. Gary is in fine voice throughout and is backed by a really lively orchestra led by musical director & pianist/keyboards Jack Borkofski."

Musical Theatre commented: "Williams obviously has what it takes to be a cabaret artist – one of the most difficult occupations for a singer. He has charisma and a great voice."

Track listing

Personnel 
Performers
 Gary Williams – vocals
 Jack Borkofski – piano/Keys/MD
 Krzystof Mroz – bass
 Yury Rabtsau – drums
 Tiago Pires da Silva – guitar
 Maxwell Roach – trumpet
 Jerzy Mucha – saxes
 Levgen Proidakov – trombone
 David Musselman, Denis De Souza – backing vocals
Technical
 Sound Engineer – Kay Richardson
 Stage Staff – Keith Bennett, Tiago da Silva, Nicholas Brkovec, Andre Santana
 Production Manager – Vasil Hristov
 Cruise Director – João Wolf
 Mastering – Paul Fawcus, Jazz Mouse Studios, UK

References

External links 
 Official Gary Williams web site: Live in Brazil

2013 live albums
Gary Williams (singer) albums